Amblyseius lassus is a species of mite in the family Phytoseiidae.

References

lassus
Articles created by Qbugbot
Animals described in 1966